Jean-Maurice Verdier (23 June 1928 – 2 December 2018) was a French lawyer and professor. He once served as President of Paris Nanterre University.

Biography
Verdier became Dean of Law and Economics at Paris Nanterre in 1970. In 1976, he became President of the university, a position he would hold until 1981. He was on the International Labour Organization Committee of Experts on the Application of Conventions and Recommendations from 1974 to 2000. He was also President of the International Society of Labor Law and Social Security until his death.

References

1928 births
2018 deaths
20th-century French lawyers
Academic staff of the University of Paris